The 2022 Caribbean Club Championship was the 24th and final edition of the Caribbean Club Championship (also known as the CFU Club Championship), the first-tier annual international club football competition in the Caribbean region, held amongst clubs whose football associations are affiliated with the Caribbean Football Union (CFU), a sub-confederation of CONCACAF.

The winners of the 2022 CONCACAF Caribbean Club Championship qualified to the 2023 CONCACAF Champions League, the second and third place teams qualified to the 2022 CONCACAF League, while the fourth place team played against the winners of the 2022 CONCACAF Caribbean Club Shield in a playoff match to determine the final Caribbean spot to the 2022 CONCACAF League.

With the expansion of the CONCACAF Champions League starting from the 2024 edition, the 2022 edition of the Caribbean Club Championship was the last held. It was replaced by the Caribbean Cup, a regional cup tournament launched as a qualifying tournament to CONCACAF Champions League for teams from the Caribbean.

Cavaly won the previous tournament, but could not defend their title as they did not qualify for the tournament.

Teams

Among the 31 CFU member associations, four of them were classified as professional leagues and each may enter two teams in the CONCACAF Caribbean Club Championship.

Association with professional league whose teams did not enter

Group stage 
The draw for the group stage was held on 3 February 2022, 11:00 EST (UTC−5), at the CONCACAF Headquarters in Miami, United States. The 6 teams were drawn into two groups of three teams. The two teams from the host association Dominican Republic, Cibao and Atlético Vega Real, were placed in Pot 1, the two teams from Haiti were placed in Pot 2, while the two teams from Jamaica were placed in Pot 3. This ensured that teams from the same association could not be drawn into the same group.

The winners and runners-up of each group advanced to the semi-finals.

All times local, AST (UTC−4).

Group A

Group B

Knockout stage

Bracket
The semi-final matchups were:
Winner Group A vs. Runner-up Group B
Winner Group B vs. Runner-up Group A

Semi-finals

Third-place match
Winners qualified for 2022 CONCACAF League. Losers advanced to CONCACAF League playoff against the 2022 CONCACAF Caribbean Club Shield winners for a place in the 2022 CONCACAF League.

Final
Winners qualified for 2023 CONCACAF Champions League. Losers qualified for 2022 CONCACAF League.

CONCACAF League playoff
The CONCACAF League playoff was played between the 2022 CONCACAF Caribbean Club Championship fourth-placed team and the 2022 CONCACAF Caribbean Club Shield winners, as long as the Shield winners comply with the minimum CONCACAF Club Licensing requirements for the CONCACAF League, with the winners qualifying for the 2022 CONCACAF League preliminary round.

See also
2022 Caribbean Club Shield
2022 CONCACAF League
2023 CONCACAF Champions League

References

External links
Caribbean Club Championship, CONCACAF.com

2022
1

2022 CONCACAF League
2023 CONCACAF Champions League